Beit Zvi School for the Performing Arts, and a Theater is an acting school, and a theater located in the Tel Aviv District city of Ramat Gan, Israel, established in 1950.

History
Beit Zvi is the country's first theater school . It was founded by Haim Gamzu.  Former director Gary Bilu established a theater for Beit Zvi graduates and mounted plays not put on by the repertory theaters. .[1] The Beit Zvi Theater is, until now, one of the most popular theaters in Israel, and the most famous actors in Israel have performed at the Beit Zvi Theater. It has five large venues which house over a dozen of productions a year. Beit Zvi's building was designed by Joseph Klarwein.

Beit Zvi offers a three-year program with an emphasis on acting in real productions.  Micah Lewensohn, appointed head of the school in 2009, is the former director of the Israel Festival. Lewensohn plans to institute a BA degree and a program in television studies.

Notable alumni and actors at the Beit Zvi Theater

Adi Ashkenazi
Lior Ashkenazi (born 1968), stage and movie actor
Shmil Ben Ari
Naomi Blumenthal
Liraz Charhi (born 1978), actress, singer, and dancer
Tzufit Grant
Amos Guttman
Keren Hadar
Samuel Maoz
Ayelet Menahemi
Rama Messinger
Khalifa Natour
Ze'ev Revach (born 1940), comedian, movie actor, and director
Yosef Shiloach
Itay Tiran

References

External links

Official site 

Israeli culture
Schools in Israel
Film schools in Israel
Educational institutions established in 1950
1950 establishments in Israel